This is a list of Japanese Americans, including both original immigrants who obtained American citizenship and their American descendants, but not Japanese nationals living or working in the US. The list includes a brief description of their reason for notability.

Arts and architecture
 Nina Akamu, artist
 Shusaku Arakawa (1936–2010), artist and architect
 Ruth Asawa (1926–2013), sculptor
 Hideo Date (1907–2005), painter associated with Synchromism movement
 Isami Doi (1903–1965), printmaker and painter
 Paul Horiuchi (1906–1999), painter and collagist
 Miyoko Ito (1918–1983), painter and watercolorist
 Ben Kamihira (1924–2004), artist and teacher
 Jeff Matsuda, Emmy award-winning concept artist, comics artist, and animator
 John Matsudaira (1922–2007), painter
 George Matsumoto (1922–2016), architect and educator
 Jimmy Mirikitani (1920–2012), painter
 Luna H. Mitani, surrealist painter
 Robert Murase (1938–2005), world-renowned landscape architect
 Hashime Murayama (1879–1954), painter
 George Nakashima (1905–1990), Nisei, woodworker, architect, and furniture maker
 Hideo Noda (1908–1939), modernist painter and muralist
 Isamu Noguchi (1904–1988), artist, sculptor, designer
 Kenjiro Nomura (1896–1956), painter
 Chiura Obata (1885–1975), well-known artist and recipient of the Order of the Sacred Treasure, 5th Class, for promoting goodwill and cultural understanding between the United States and Japan
Toshio Odate (born 1930), Japanese woodworker, sculptor, educator; born in Japan and moved to the United States in 1948.
 Masi Oka, actor and digital effects artist, raised in the United States
 Arthur Okamura (1932–2009), California painter, illustrator and screen-printer associated with the San Francisco Renaissance
 Miné Okubo (1912–2001), Nisei, painter, author of Citizen 13660, her book documenting life during her confinement in the Japanese American internment
 Yoko Ono (1933–), artist, musician, author and peace activist, known for her work in avant-garde art, music and filmmaking as well as her marriage to John Lennon
 Sueo Serisawa (1910–2004), Issei, Californian Impressionist artist
 Toshiko Takaezu (1922–2011), born and died in Hawaii; ceramic artist and painter; known for closed pots and cylindrical vessels
 Adrian Tomine, graphic novelist (Shortcomings)
 George Tsutakawa (1910–1997), sculptor and painter
 Minoru Yamasaki (1912–1986), Nisei, architect, best known for the New York World Trade Center "Twin Towers"
 Ray Yoshida (1930–2009), painter and collagist, teacher at the School of the Art Institute of Chicago, and an important mentor of the Chicago Imagists

Business and economics
 Barbara Adachi, principal at Deloitte 
 Takeshi Amemiya, economist, Stanford professor
 Hiroaki Aoki, founder of Benihana
 Glen Fukushima, co-president and Representative Director, NCR Japan, Ltd., and former president, American Chamber of Commerce in Japan
 Francis Fukuyama, economist and historian
 Kelly Goto, American entrepreneur and author specializing in user experience design and contextual research.
 Robert Hamada, Edward Eagle Brown Distinguished Service Professor of Finance; former Dean of the University of Chicago Graduate School of Business
 Jon Ikeda, automobile designer, Vice President and Brand Officer of Acura
 Wayne Inouye, former president and CEO of Gateway, Inc.
 Roy Kusumoto, founder of Solectron
 Darren Kimura, founder of Sopogy, inventor of MicroCSP technology
 Nobu Matsuhisa, founder of Nobu and Matsuhisa
 Fujimatsu Moriguchi (1898–1962), founder of Uwajimaya
 Bill Naito (1925–1996), prominent businessman in Portland, Oregon
 Alice Sae Teshima Noda (1894–1964), businesswoman, dental hygienist, and beauty industry entrepreneur
 Scott Oki, former Senior Vice President of sales and marketing at Microsoft
 William Saito, founder of I/O Software, Inc. (acquired by Microsoft in 2004), venture capitalist and public policy consultant
 Richard Sakai, producer and President of Gracie Films
Miyoko Schinner, founder Miyoko's Creamery, chef and cookbook author
 George Shima (1864–1926), first Japanese American millionaire
 Gary A. Tanaka, financier
 Dave Tatsuno, businessman and filmmaker
 Kevin Tsujihara, CEO, Warner Brothers
 Ken Uston, blackjack player, strategist, and author

Entertainment
 Keiko Agena, actress (Gilmore Girls TV series)
 Jhene Aiko, singer/songwriter, maternal grandfather is Japanese-American (Nisei)
 Anna Akana, YouTube celebrity, actress/comedian, filmmaker, author
 Asa Akira, pornographic actress and director
 Toshiko Akiyoshi, Shin-Issei, musician, jazz pianist, composer, arranger and big band leader
 Shuko Akune, actress
 Daniella Alonso, actress; father is of part Japanese descent
 Sally Amaki, singer and voice actress, member of idol group 22/7
 Devon Aoki, model and actress; half Japanese
 Steve Aoki, house musician and record producer
 Tsuru Aoki (1892–1961), Issei, actress
 Gregg Araki, film director
 Reiko Aylesworth, actress known for portraying Michelle Dessler in TV Series 24; grandmother is Japanese
 Nadia Azzi, pianist
 Darren Barnet, actor
 Nichole Bloom, actress and model; mother is Japanese
 Kaylee Bryant, actress on Legacies (Okinawan via her grandfather)
 Kenji Bunch, composer and violist
 Artt Butler, voice actor; half Japanese
 Dean Cain, actor, best known for playing the dual role of Clark Kent/Superman in the TV series Lois & Clark: The New Adventures of Superman; paternal grandfather is of Japanese descent
 Asia Carrera, former pornographic actress; half Japanese
 Louis Ozawa Changchien, actor; half Japanese
 China Chow, actress and model (daughter of Tina Chow); 1/4 Japanese.
 Tina Chow, model and jewelry designer who was considered an influential fashion icon of the 1970s and 1980s; mother is Japanese mother
 Mark Dacascos, actor and martial artist; biological mother, Moriko McVey-Murray, is half Japanese.
 Ian Anthony Dale, actor (Mr. 3000); mother is Japanese, father is French-English
 Romi Dames, actress, voice artist
 Marié Digby, singer-songwriter, guitarist, pianist; half Japanese
 DJ Heavygrinder, disc jockey; mother is Japanese
 Yvonne Elliman, singer-songwriter; mother is Japanese
 Lieko English, model and actress. She is known for being Playboys Playmate of the Month in 1971.
 Maya Erskine, film actress; half Japanese
 Takayo Fischer, Nisei, actress
 Tak Fujimoto, Nisei, cinematographer of many Hollywood films, including The Silence of the Lambs and Ferris Bueller's Day Off
 Jun Fujita (1888–1963), Issei, silent movie actor, Essanay Studios of Chicago
 Koichi Fukuda, Static-X band member
 Karen Fukuhara, actress
 Cary Fukunaga, Emmy-award-winning filmmaker and writer known for directing & executive producing the first season of HBO series True Detective and for directing the 2021 James Bond film No Time to Die (father is 3rd generation Japanese American)
 Umi Garrett, pianist
 Rigel Gemini, music artist; one quarter Japanese
 Kimiko Glenn, actress and singer, known for portraying "Brook Soso" in the Netflix TV series Orange Is the New Black
 Alésia Glidewell, web series director, producer and voice actress. Known for providing face and body models in Portal and Portal 2, Left 4 Dead and other video games; mother is Japanese 
 Griffin Gluck, film & TV actor; paternal grandmother is Japanese
 Tom Gorai, film producer
 Midori Gotō, classical violinist and recipient of the Avery Fisher Prize
 Ryu Goto, violinist
 Kina Grannis, singer-songwriter, guitarist and a YouTuber; mother is Japanese
 Conan Gray, singer-songwriter and social media personality; mother is Japanese
 Alice Greczyn, actress and model; part Japanese
 Ann Harada, actress (musical Avenue Q)
 Teri Harrison, model and actress.  Playboys Playmate of the Month in October 2002; mother is half-Japanese
 Kayo Hatta (1958–2005), filmmaker (Sundance Award winner Picture Bride)
 Sessue Hayakawa (1886–1973), Issei, Academy Award-nominated actor
 Matt Heafy, lead vocalist of band Trivium; mother is Japanese
 Marie Helvin, fashion model; mother is Japanese
 Don Henrie, self-proclaimed vampire and an "Alt" on the short-lived Sci Fi Channel series Mad Mad House; half Japanese
 Ryan Higa, YouTube celebrity, actor, comedian, and producer
 Judith Hill, singer-songwriter, provided backing vocals for such artists as Michael Jackson, Stevie Wonder and Josh Groban; mother is Japanese
 Satoshi Hino, voice actor
 Kazu Hiro, Academy Award-winning special make-up effects artist and visual artist
 James Holzhauer, Jeopardy! contestant and professional sports gambler; grandmother born in Japan
 Shizuko Hoshi, Shin-Issei (Japanese-born), actress
 Glenn Howerton, actor, producer, screenwriter, and director, best known as Dennis Reynolds on the TV series It's Always Sunny in Philadelphia; born in Japan to American parents
 James Iha, guitarist for The Smashing Pumpkins and A Perfect Circle
 Suzee Ikeda, singer who was the first Asian-American solo artist at Motown. Best known for her work "behind the scenes" at Motown with such acts as Michael Jackson and The Temptations; father is Japanese
 Jeff Imada, actor, stuntman, stunt coordinator
 Grant Imahara (1970–2020), Yonsei, builder and host on MythBusters TV series on Discovery Channel
 Carrie Ann Inaba, dancer, actress
 Joe Inoue, pop and rock musician
 Brittany Ishibashi, TV and film actress
 Tatsuya Ishida, creator of the webcomic Sinfest
 Miki Ishikawa, actress
 Miyuki Melody Ishikawa, singer and former host of NHK World TV music show J-Melo
 Maryanne Ito, soul singer, songwriter, and performer
 Robert Ito, Nisei (Canadian-born), actor, best known as "Dr. Sam Fujiyama" on the TV series Quincy, M.E.
 Yuna Ito, singer and actress, also of half Korean descent
 Micah Iverson, musician and contestant from The Voice season 18; born and raised in Japan, later moved to the United States
 Mila J, singer, rapper, dancer; sister of Jhene Aiko
 Jadagrace, actress, dancer, and singer. She appeared in the 2009 film, Terminator Salvation; mother is Japanese-American
 Jero, born Jerome Charles White, Jr., enka singer in Japan; grandmother was Japanese
 Ben Jorgensen, musician, best known as the lead singer and guitarist of the rock band Armor for Sleep; part Japanese
 Rodney Kageyama (1941–2018), Nisei, actor
 Stacy Kamano, TV actress known for her role on Baywatch; father is Japanese
 Janice Kawaye, voice actress
 Candace Kita, film and TV actress
 Hayley Kiyoko, actress, singer
 Ariane Koizumi, film actress
 Christina Kokubo, film and TV actress
 Hokuto Konishi, dancer and b-boy, member of the season three-winning crew on America's Best Dance Crew
 Mia Korf, film and TV actress; mother is Japanese
 Kane Kosugi, actor and martial artist, son of Sho Kosugi
 Sho Kosugi, Shin-Issei (Japanese-born), actor and martial artist
 Shin Koyamada, Shin-Issei (Japanese-born), actor, producer, philanthropist, and martial artist
 Asako Kōzuki, voice actress, voice of Princess Peach from the Super Mario series
 Louisa Krause, film, stage, and television actress; father is of half-Japanese descent (from Okinawa, Japan)
 Emily Kuroda, actress (Gilmore Girls TV series)
 Karyn Kusama, director
 Clyde Kusatsu, actor
 George Kuwa (1885–1931), actor
 Bob Kuwahara, animator for Walt Disney and Terrytoons; created Hashimoto-san series
 Dan Kwong, performance artist, writer, playwright (Be Like Water)
 Jeff LaBar, guitarist of Cinderella
 Jake E. Lee, heavy metal guitarist, known for his work with Ozzy Osbourne and in his own band Badlands
 Sean Ono Lennon, Hapa Nisei, musician, son of John Lennon and Yoko Ono
 James Hiroyuki Liao, actor; half Japanese
 Lotus Long actress who began her acting career in Hollywood movies in the 1920s; father was of Japanese descent
 Olivia Lufkin, singer-songwriter
 Adelle Lutz, actress, costume designer, performance artist and sculptor; sister of Tina Chow; mother is Japanese
 Mackenyu, actor
 Ally Maki, film and TV actress
 Mako (1933–2006), Shin-Issei (Japanese-born), actor, Academy Award nominee for Best Actor in a Supporting Role (The Sand Pebbles), Tony Award nominee for Best Actor (Pacific Overtures), founder of East West Players
 Bryan Mantia, contemporary rock drummer and composer who was a drummer for bands such as Primus (band), Guns N' Roses, Praxis, and Godflesh; mother is Japanese-American
 Lily Mariye, actress (ER), filmmaker
 Money Mark, producer and musician, best known for his collaborations with the Beastie Boys from 1992 until 2011; father is Japanese-Hawaiian
 Keiko Matsui, Shin-Issei (Japanese-born), jazz musician
 Kent Matsuoka, Nisei producer and location manager
 Nobu McCarthy (1934–2002), Kibei (Canadian-born), actress (Farewell to Manzanar, Wake Me When It's Over, Walk Like A Dragon)
 Linda McDonald, drummer of the all-female tribute band The Iron Maidens; she is of Irish and Japanese descent
 Elle McLemore, stage & TV actress; 1/4 Japanese
 Meiko, L.A.-based singer-songwriter; one-quarter Japanese on her mother's side
 Emi Meyer, jazz pianist and singer-songwriter; mother is Japanese
 Anne Akiko Meyers, classical violinist
 Derek Mio, Yonsei, actor (TV series Greek, Day One)
 Mitski, singer-songwriter and musician; mother is Japanese
 Kim Miyori, actress (St. Elsewhere TV series)
 Diane Mizota, dancer, actress, and TV personality
 Pat Morita (1932–2005), Nisei, Academy Award-nominated actor and comedian
 Hiro Murai, Director (Atlanta (TV series), "This Is America" music video)
 Glen Murakami, animator, director, producer
 Doris Muramatsu, Girlyman band member
 Alan Muraoka, actor and theatre director who plays the current owner of Hooper's Store on Sesame Street
 Mina Myōi, singer, dancer, and a member of South Korean girl group Twice
 Kent Nagano, conductor, Los Angeles Symphony
 Robert A. Nakamura, filmmaker, co-founder of Visual Communications, teacher
 Suzy Nakamura, Sansei, actress
 Desmond Nakano, Sansei, film director (White Man's Burden, American Pastime) and screenwriter (Last Exit to Brooklyn, American Me, White Man's Burden, American Pastime)
 Ken Narasaki, Sansei, actor, playwright
 Hiro Narita, Shin-Issei (Japanese-born), cinematographer
 Lane Nishikawa, Sansei, actor, filmmaker, playwright and performance artist
 Kevin "KevNish" Nishimura, musician, member of the Far East Movement (half Japanese)
Trina Nishimura, voice actress
 George Nozuka, R&B singer
 Justin Nozuka, singer, younger brother of George Nozuka
 Philip Nozuka, actor, younger brother of George Nozuka
 Sophie Tamiko Oda (1991–), child actress
 Masi Oka, Shin-Issei (Japanese-born), Golden Globe-nominated television actor (Heroes)
 Daryn Okada, cinematographer, current president of American Society of Cinematographers
 Steven Okazaki, Sansei, Academy Award-winning documentary filmmaker
 Amy Okuda, film and TV actress
 Ryo Okumoto, Spock's Beard band member
 Yuji Okumoto, Sansei, actor
 Lisa Onodera, film producer (Picture Bride, The Debut, Americanese)
 Sono Osato (1919–2018), dancer and actress; father is Japanese
 Yuko Oshima, idol, actress, and a former member of AKB48; mother is half Japanese
 Ken and Miye Ota, champion ballroom dancers, martial artists (Aikido and Judo)
 Seiji Ozawa, conductor, director of the Boston Symphony Orchestra from 1973 to 2002
 Mizuo Peck, actress; mother is Japanese
 Ryan Potter, actor (Big Hero 6 and Big Hero 6: The Series) and martial artist
 Douglas Robb, lead singer of Hoobastank; mother is Japanese
 Grace Rolek, actress, voice actress and singer; 1/4 Japanese
 Bianca Ryan, winner of America's Got Talent; mother is half Japanese
 Nick Sakai, actor and producer
 Stan Sakai, cartoonist, creator of Usagi Yojimbo comic series
 Harold Sakata (1920–1982), Nisei, actor ("Odd Job" from James Bond film Goldfinger) and wrestler (see also "Sports" section)
 Tony Sano, game show host
 Reiko Sato (1931–1981), Nisei, dancer and actress (Flower Drum Song, The Ugly American) Kylee Saunders, singer based in Japan
 Lisa Marie Scott, model and actress, known for her appearances in Playboy magazine and for being Playboys Playmate of the Month in 1995; mother is Japanese from Okinawa
 Toshi Seeger, filmmaker and environmental activist, founder of the Clearwater Festival
 James Shigeta (1929–2014), Sansei, actor (Bridge to the Sun, Crimson Kimono, Flower Drum Song, Walk Like a Dragon) and American popular standards singer
 Laura Shigihara, composer and singer-songwriter, known for composing the Plants vs. Zombies soundtrack
 Tak Shindo, musician, composer and arranger. He was one of the prominent artists in the exotica music genre during the late 1950s and early 1960s.
 Jake Shimabukuro, ukulele virtuoso
 Jenny Shimizu, model and actress
 Yuki Shimoda (1921–1981), Nisei, actor
 Sab Shimono, actor
 Larry Shinoda, automotive designer noted for his work on the Corvette and the Boss 302 Mustang
 Mike Shinoda, Linkin Park band member; father is Japanese
 Kimora Lee Simmons, fashion model and fashion designer (according to Simmons, her mother Joanne "Kyoko" Kimora is of fully Japanese descent, and was a war refugee who moved to Korea)
 Dan Smyers, singer-songwriter, member of the country music duo Dan + Shay; maternal grandmother is Japanese
 Jack Soo (Goro Suzuki) (1916–1979), Nisei, actor (Flower Drum Song, portrayed Detective Sergeant Nick Yemana in Barney Miller TV series)
 Joanna Sotomura, TV and film actress
 Chrishell Stause, TV actress; 1/4 Japanese
 Stephanie, singer; half Japanese
 Booboo Stewart, actor; mother is part Japanese
 Aya Sumika, former actress; mother is Japanese
 Dave Suzuki, death metal multi-instrumentalist, best known for his work as the guitarist, lyricist, bassist and drummer for Vital Remains and as a touring guitarist with Deicide
 Pat Suzuki, Nisei, American popular standards singer and actress (Flower Drum Song Original Broadway Cast)
 Shoji Tabuchi, Shin-Issei (Japanese-born), famous fiddler
 Jimmy Taenaka, film and TV actor
 Charlie Tagawa, musical entertainer, banjoist. He was regarded as one of the best contemporary banjo players and arguably one of the all-time best.
 Cary-Hiroyuki Tagawa, Shin-Issei (Japanese-born), actor
 Kobe Tai, porn star; half Taiwanese and half Japanese, Very Bad Things.
 Rea Tajiri, Sansei, filmmaker
 Miiko Taka (1925–2023), Nisei, actress, starred opposite Marlon Brando in Sayonara
 Iwao Takamoto (1925–2007), Nisei, animator/producer for Hanna Barbera, creator of Scooby-Doo Cyril Takayama, illusionist
 George Takei, Nisei, actor, "Sulu" from Star Trek TV series and films
 Sara Tanaka, actress
 Chris Tashima, Sansei, actor, Academy Award-winning director (Visas and Virtue)
 Teppei Teranishi, Thrice band member
 Mayuka Thaïs, singer-songwriter, artist, actress, voice over artist, art educator, and edutainer; father was Japanese
 Brian Tochi, actor; Sansei Mika Todd, singer and former member of the Hello! Project groups Coconuts Musume and Minimoni; mother is Japanese
 Mia Doi Todd, singer-songwriter; Mother is of Japanese descent
 Tamlyn Tomita, actress; Sansei on father's side and mother is Japanese/Filipina
 Jerry Tondo, actor
 Daisuke Tsuji, actor (The Man in the High Castle, Ghost of Tsushima)
 Uffie, singer, songwriter, rapper, DJ, and fashion designer; mother is Japanese
 Miyoshi Umeki (1929–2007), Shin-Issei, Academy Award-winning actress (Sayonara) and American popular standards singer
 Michael Toshiyuki Uno, Academy Award-nominated director
 Hikaru Utada, singer/songwriter. Multi-million selling Japanese pop music star. Topped Billboard Club chart with "Devil Inside" in 2004
 Gedde Watanabe, Sansei, actor, Long Duk Dong in Sixteen Candles Daniel Kamihira White, magician; mother is Japanese
 Don "the Dragon" Wilson, Hapa, actor in Hollywood action films, mother is Japanese (see also Sports below)
 Linda Wong (pornographic actress), pornographic actress
 Lena Yada, model, actress, professional tandem surfer and a professional wrestler who is known for her time in World Wrestling Entertainment (WWE)
 Rachael Yamagata, Hapa, Yonsei, singer, songwriter, pianist; Sansei father and German-Italian mother
 Hiro Yamamoto, original bass player for Soundgarden
 Iris Yamashita, Academy Award-nominated screenwriter (Letters from Iwo Jima)
 G. Yamazawa, poet and rapper born to Japanese parents who didn't grow up in an Asian-American community
 Sotaro Yasuda, actor
 Patti Yasutake, actress who played "Nurse Alyssa Ogawa" on Star Trek: The Next Generation TV series
 Jenny Yokobori, voice actress born to Japanese parents

History
 Kwan-Ichi Asakawa (1873–1948), historian, professor at Yale
 Yamato Ichihashi (1878–1963), one of the first Asian academics in the US
 Yuji Ichioka (1936–2002), historian, coined the term "Asian American"
 Akira Iriye, historian, professor at Harvard
 Shunzo Sakamaki (1906–1973), historian, professor at University of Hawaii at Manoa
 Ronald Takaki (1939–2009), historian, University of California, Berkeley professor

Literature and poetry
 Jun Fujita (1888–1963), Issei, poet, wrote the first American Tanka poetry book in 1923, TANKA: Poems in Exile Dale Furutani (1941–), novelist
 Philip Kan Gotanda (1951–), Sansei, playwright
 Jeanne Wakatsuki Houston (1934–), Nisei, novelist, author of Farewell to Manzanar Naomi Iizuka (1965–), Shin-Issei (Japanese-born), playwright
 Ayako Ishigaki (1903–1996), Issei, journalist and memoirist
 Lawson Fusao Inada (1938–), Nisei, poet and former poet laureate of the state of Oregon
 Cynthia Kadohata (1956–), novelist; winner of the Newbery Medal (2005) and National Book Award for Young People's Literature (2013)
 Hiroshi Kashiwagi (1922–2019), Nisei, poet, playwright, actor
 Soji Kashiwagi (1962–), Sansei, playwright and producer (Grateful Crane Ensemble theater company)
 Sarah Kay (poet) (1988–), known for her spoken word poetry. Her mother is a 4th generation Japanese-American (Yonsei)
 Katie Kitamura (1979–), novelist, journalist, and art critic.
 Janice Mirikitani (1941–2021), former poet laureate for San Francisco
 David Mura (1952–), poet, memoirist, and novelist
 John Okada (1923–1971), author of No-No Boy Julie Otsuka (1962–), novelist
 Ruth Ozeki (1956–), novelist
 Albert Saijo (1926–2011), poet
 Monica Sone (1919–2011), author of the autobiographical Nisei Daughter 
 Etsu Inagaki Sugimoto (1874–1950), memoirist
 Toyo Suyemoto (1916–2003), poet, memoirist, and librarian
 Yoshiko Uchida (1921–1992), Nisei, author
 Michi Weglyn (1926–1999), author and recipient of the Anisfield-Wolf Book Award in 1977
 Hisaye Yamamoto (1921–2011), award-winning short story writer
 Karen Tei Yamashita (1951–), author and playwright, recipient of the 2021 National Book Foundation's Medal for Distinguished Contribution to American Letters
 Wakako Yamauchi (1924–2018), Nisei, playwright
 Taro Yashima (1908–1994), author and illustrator; recipient of the 1955 Children's Book Award

News/media
 Ann Curry, former network anchor and correspondent for NBC News and The Today Show Dina Eastwood, anchor
 Naoko Funayama, Japanese-American Sports Castcaster, 
 Jun Fujita (1888–1963), Issei, photographer/photojournalist
 Joseph Heco (1837–1897), fisherman and writer, first to publish Japanese language newspaper
 Bill Hosokawa (1915–2007), Nisei, Denver Post journalist, columnist, editor, and author
 Michiko Kakutani, Pulitzer Prize-winning literary critic and former chief book critic for The New York Times Fred Katayama, anchor, Reuters Television, New York
 Guy Kawasaki, author, Apple evangelist
 Sachi Koto, former CNN news anchor
 Lori Matsukawa, former evening news anchor, KING5, Seattle
 Rob Mayeda, NBC Bay Area Weather Plus meteorologist
 Denise Nakano, anchor, WCAU NBC 10, Philadelphia
 Ellen Nakashima, journalist, The Washington Post Kent Ninomiya, anchor, reporter and news executive
 James Omura (1912–1994), Nisei, journalist, editor, and civil rights leader
 David Ono, anchor, ABC7, Los Angeles
 Roxana Saberi, reporter, mother is an immigrant from Japan
 James Sakamoto (1903–1955), Nisei, journalist, columnist, editor, and boxer, founded first English-language Japanese American newspaper
 Scott Sassa, former president, NBC West Coast
 Tricia Takasugi, anchor, KTTV Fox 11, Los Angeles
 Iva Toguri (1916–2006), Nisei, radio broadcaster nicknamed "Tokyo Rose"
 Tritia Toyota, former anchor, KNBC and KCBS, Los Angeles

Martial arts
 Taky Kimura (1924–2021), martial arts practitioner and instructor certified by Bruce Lee to teach Jun Fan Gung Fu or Jeet Kune Do
 Toshihiro Oshiro, martial arts master and instructor from Haneji, Okinawa; a founder of the Ryukyu Bujutsu Kenkyu Doyukai
 Don "The Dragon" Wilson, former world champion kickboxer and action movie star

Military

 Thomas P. Bostick (born 1956), lieutenant general, U. S. Army Chief of Engineers
 Barney F. Hajiro (1916–2011), Medal of Honor recipient in World War II
 Harry B. Harris Jr., admiral (four stars) United States Navy, commander of the United States Pacific Fleet
 Mikio Hasemoto (1916–1943), Medal of Honor recipient in World War II
 Joe Hayashi (1920–1945), Medal of Honor recipient in World War II
 Shizuya Hayashi (1917–2008), Medal of Honor recipient in World War II
 Chiyoki Ikeda (1920–1960), CIA officer, recipient of Bronze Star in China in World War II
 Daniel Inouye (1924–2012), former senator from Hawaii, Medal of Honor recipient World War II
 Theodore Kanamine (1929–2023), a United States Army brigadier general
 Terry Teruo Kawamura (1949–1969), Medal of Honor recipient, sergeant first class in the Vietnam War
 Yeiki Kobashigawa (1920–2005), Medal of Honor recipient in World War II
 Robert T. Kuroda (1922–1944), Medal of Honor recipient in World War II
 Ben Kuroki (1917–2015), the only Japanese-American Army Air Force pilot to fly combat missions in the Pacific theater in World War II
 Susan K. Mashiko, major general (two stars) United States Air Force, November 2009–present
 Roy Matsumoto (1913–2014), master sergeant, U.S. Army; member of Merrill's Marauders; inductee of the U.S. Army Rangers Hall of Fame and the Military Intelligence Corps Hall of Fame
 Hiroshi Miyamura (1925–2022), Medal of Honor recipient, corporal in Korean War
 Kenneth P. Moritsugu, former acting Surgeon General of the United States; rear admiral, USPHS
 Kaoru Moto (1917–1992), Medal of Honor recipient in World War II
 James Mukoyama, United States Army major general
 Sadao Munemori (1922–1945), Medal of Honor recipient, private first class in World War II
 Kiyoshi K. Muranaga (1922–1944), Medal of Honor recipient in World War II
 Michael K. Nagata, United States Army lieutenant general
 Masato Nakae (1917–1998), Medal of Honor recipient in World War II
 Shinyei Nakamine (1920–1944), Medal of Honor recipient in World War II
 William K. Nakamura (1922–1944), Medal of Honor recipient, private first class in World War II
 Paul M. Nakasone (born 1963), U.S. Army four-star general, 3rd commander of the United States Cyber Command and 18th Director of the National Security Agency
 Joe M. Nishimoto (1920–1944), Medal of Honor recipient in World War II
 Allan M. Ohata (1918–1977), Medal of Honor recipient in World War II
 Vincent Okamoto (1943–2020), highly decorated veteran of the Vietnam War
 James K. Okubo (1920–1967), Medal of Honor recipient in World War II
 Yukio Okutsu (1921–2003), Medal of Honor recipient in World War II
 Allen K. Ono, first Japanese-American lieutenant general
 Frank H. Ono (1923–1980), Medal of Honor recipient in World War II
 Kazuo Otani (1918–1944), Medal of Honor recipient in World War II
 George T. Sakato (1921–2015), Medal of Honor recipient in World War II
 Eric Shinseki, United States Army general, Army Chief of Staff (1999–2003), Secretary of Veterans Affairs (2009–2014)
 Francis Takemoto (1912–2002), first Japanese-American general officer in the U.S. military
 Ted T. Tanouye (1919–1944), Medal of Honor recipient in World War II
 Ehren Watada, first commissioned officer in the U.S. armed forces to publicly refuse deployment to Iraq, discharged "under Other-Than-Honorable-Conditions" in 2009
 Bruce Yamashita, worked to expose racial discrimination in the United States Marine Corps
 Rodney James Takashi Yano (1943–1969), Medal of Honor recipient, sergeant first class in the Vietnam War

Politics, law and government
 Sanji Abe (1895–1982), first Japanese American in the Hawaii Territorial Senate (1940–1943)
 Jeff Adachi (1959–2019), elected Public Defender of San Francisco, a pension reform advocate, and a director of multiple films. 
 Richard Aoki (1938–2009), civil rights activist and co-founder of the Black Panther Party
 George Ariyoshi, first Asian American governor of a U.S. state (Hawaii)
 Alexander Arvizu (born 1958), US diplomat, United States Ambassador to Albania from 2010 to 2015
 Sue Kunitomi Embrey (1923–2006), co-founder of the Manzanar Committee who worked to gain National Historic Site status for the former concentration camp
 Henry Hajimu Fujii, civic leader, Order of the Rising Sun recipient, Idaho
 Warren Furutani, California State Assemblyman, 55th District
 Colleen Hanabusa, Congresswoman from Hawaii
 Bruce Harrell, Acting Mayor of Seattle in 2017 and the current mayor of Seattle
 Bob Hasegawa, Member, House of Representatives, Washington State Legislature
 S. I. Hayakawa (1906–1992), Canadian, former Senator from California and linguistics scholar
 Aiko Herzig-Yoshinaga (1925–2018), civil rights activist and lead researcher of the Commission on Wartime Relocation and Internment of Civilians
 Gordon Hirabayashi (1918–2012), plaintiff in Hirabayashi v. United States, which challenged Japanese American internment during World War II
 Mazie Hirono, former lieutenant governor of Hawaii, currently Senator from Hawaii
 Mike Honda, Congressman from California
 Paul Igasaki, former vice-chair and Chair of the U.S. Equal Employment Opportunity Commission
 David Ige, governor of Hawaii since 2014
 Daniel Inouye (1924–2012), former Senator from Hawaii, Medal of Honor recipient, former President pro tempore of the United States Senate, and third in the United States presidential line of succession
 Lance Ito, judge, presided over O. J. Simpson criminal trial
 Jani Iwamoto, Democratic Utah Senator
 Lincoln Kanai (1908–1982), plaintiff in ex parte Kanai, which challenged the constitutionality of the WWII incarceration
 James Kanno (1925–2017), mayor of Fountain Valley, California from 1957 to 1962
 Yuri Kochiyama (1921–2014), Japanese American civil rights activist and friend of Malcolm X
 Russell S. Kokubun, member, Hawaii State Senate
 Fred Korematsu (1919–2005), Medal of Freedom recipient who argued against the internment
 Aki Kurose (1925–2008), activist and educator who helped establish Seattle's first Head Start Program
 Mari Matsuda, first tenured Asian American female law professor in the United States
 Kinjiro Matsudaira (1885–1963), mayor of Edmonston, Maryland in 1927 and 1943
 Doris Matsui, Congresswoman from California and widow of Robert Matsui
 Robert Matsui (1941–2005), late Congressman from California and former chair of the Democratic Congressional Campaign Committee
 Spark Matsunaga (1916–1990), US Senator from Hawaii
 Stan Matsunaka, Colorado State Senator
 Norman Mineta (1931–2022), Mayor of San Jose, California, Congressman from California, Secretary of Commerce, Secretary of Transportation
 Patsy Takemoto Mink (1927–2002), first Asian American Congresswoman, Hawaii
 Hermina Morita, member, House of Representatives, Hawaii State Legislature
 Kenneth P. Moritsugu, United States Surgeon General (acting) from 2006 to 2007
 Alan Nakanishi, California State Assemblyman, 10th District 2002–08
 George Nakano, former California State Assemblyman
 Paula A. Nakayama, Associate Justice of the Hawaii State Supreme Court
 Karen Narasaki, executive director of the Asian American Justice Center
 Clarence K. Nishihara, member, Hawaii State Senate
 Steere Noda (1892–1986), politician, lawyer, and baseball player in the State of Hawaii
 Blake Oshiro, lawyer, former deputy chief of staff to the Governor of Hawaii and Majority Leader of the Hawaii House of Representatives
 Pete Rouse, interim White House Chief of Staff in the Barack Obama administration
 Scott Saiki, member, House of Representatives, Hawaii State Legislature
 Thomas Sakakihara (1900–1976), member 1932–1954, House of Representatives, Hawaii Territorial Legislature
 Sharon Tomiko Santos, Majority Whip, House of Representatives, Washington State Legislature
 Eunice Sato (1921–2021), first Asian-American female mayor of a major American city (Long Beach, California)
 Maile Shimabukuro, member, House of Representatives, Hawaii State Legislature
 Mark Takai, former member, House of Representatives, Hawaii State Legislature
 Dwight Takamine, member, House of Representatives, Hawaii State Legislature
 Mark Takano (1960–), Congressman representing the 41st Congressional District of California; first LGBT person of color to be elected to Congress
 Gregg Takayama, member, House of Representatives, Hawaii State Legislature
 Robert Mitsuhiro Takasugi (1930–2009), first Japanese-American appointed to the federal bench
 Paul Tanaka, Mayor of the City of Gardena and Assistant Sheriff of the Los Angeles County Sheriff's Department
 A. Wallace Tashima, U.S. Court of Appeals, Ninth Circuit
 Jill N. Tokuda, member, Hawaii State Senate and US House of Representatives 
 Grayce Uyehara, social worker and activist
 Takuji Yamashita (1874–1959), early civil rights pioneer
 Minoru Yasui (1916-1986), plaintiff in Yasui v. United States

Religion
 Yoshiaki Fukuda (1898–1957), Bishop and missionary of Konkokyo
 Robert T. Hoshibata, Bishop of the United Methodist Church
 Mineo Katagiri (1919–2005), minister and activist
 Gyomay Kubose (1905–2000), Buddhist teacher and founder of  Chicago Buddhist Church
 Shuichi Thomas Kurai (1947–2018), Sōtō Zen Rōshi and head abbot of Sozenji Buddhist Temple
 Roy I. Sano, Bishop of the United Methodist Church
 Nyogen Senzaki (1876–1958), one of the 20th century's leading proponents of Zen Buddhism
 Shunryū Suzuki (1904–1971), Sōtō Zen monk and teacher who helped popularize Zen Buddhism in the United States
 Kenneth K. Tanaka, scholar, author, translator and ordained Jōdo Shinshū priest
 Mitsumyo Tottori (1898–1976), Shingon Buddhist priest and missionary who was active in Hawaii
 Taitetsu Unno, Buddhist scholar, lecturer, and author

Science and technology
 Keiiti Aki (1930–2005), seismologist
 George I. Fujimoto, chemist
 Ted Fujita (1920–1998), creator of the Fujita scale
 Chris Hirata, cosmologist and astrophysicist
 Harvey Itano (1920–2010), biochemist and member of the United States National Academy of Sciences
 Mizuko Ito, cultural anthropologist at the University of California, Irvine
 Akiko Iwasaki, immunologist and professor at Yale University
 Michio Kaku, theoretical physicist specializing in string field theory
 Akihiro Kanamori, mathematician specializing in set theory
 Jay Kochi (1927–2008), chemist
 Dorinne K. Kondo, anthropologist
 John Maeda, computer scientist, artist, professor at MIT
 Syukuro Manabe, 2021 Nobel Laureate in Physics
 Teruhisa Matsusaka (1926–2006), mathematician specializing in algebraic geometry
 Yoky Matsuoka, computer scientist; 2007 MacArthur Fellow
 Horace Yomishi Mochizuki (1937–1989), mathematician specializing in group theory
 Shuji Nakamura, 2014 Nobel Laureate in Physics
 Yoichiro Nambu (1921–2015), 2008 Nobel Laureate in Physics
 Isaac Namioka (1928–2019), mathematician who worked in general topology and functional analysis
 Susumu Ohno (1928–2000), geneticist and evolutionary biologist
 Ellison Onizuka (1946–1986), first Asian American astronaut; one of the "Challenger Seven"
 Ken Ono, mathematician specializing in number theory
 Santa J. Ono, immunologist, biologist, 28th President University of Cincinnati, 15th President & Vice-Chancellor University of British Columbia, 15th President University of Michigan
 Takashi Ono, mathematician specializing in number theory and algebraic groups
 Charles J. Pedersen (1904–1989), 1987 Nobel laureate in Chemistry; his mother was Japanese
 Gordon H. Sato (1927–2017), cell biologist and member of the United States National Academy of Sciences
 Tsutomu Shimomura, computer security expert
 Takamine Jōkichi (1854–1922) successful biochemist who founded one of the earliest pharmaceutical companies (Japanese expatriate)
 Daniel M. Tani, astronaut
 Takeshi Utsumi, computer simulationist
 Lauren Kiyomi Williams, mathematician
 Ryuzo Yanagimachi, reproductive biologist and member of the United States National Academy of Sciences
 Sho Yano, physician and former child prodigy

Sports
 Darwin Barney, MLB player, grandmother is from Japan and grandfather is from Korea.
 Steve Caballero, professional skateboarder and musician. In 1999, Thrasher Magazine named Caballero the "Skater of the Century". (Father is Japanese)
 Clarissa Chun, American Olympic women's freestyle wrestler. The first female wrestler from Hawaii to win a medal at the Olympics. (Mother is Japanese-American)
 Bryan Clay, 2008 Olympic gold medalist in the decathlon
 Sophia Danenberg, mountain climber best known as the first African American and the first black woman to climb to the summit of Mount Everest. (Mother is Japanese)
 Rickie Fowler, professional golfer, maternal grandfather is Japanese
 Paul Fujii, professional boxer and WBA Junior Welterweight champion
 Tadd Fujikawa, teen golfer
 Corey Gaines, NBA player
 Robert Griffin III, retired NFL quarterback and 2011 Heisman Trophy winner, born in Japan to American parents
 Miki Gorman (1935–2015), two-time winner of both the Boston and New York City marathons; former American and unofficial world record holder in the marathon
 Jeremy Guthrie, MLB player, mother is of Japanese descent
 Atlee Hammaker, All-Star MLB player, mother is of Japanese descent
 Hiroto Hirashima, member of the American Bowling Congress Hall of Fame
 Takashi "Halo" Hirose, first Japanese American to represent the United States in any international swimming competition, and the first to set a swimming world record
 Christian Hosoi, professional skateboarder
 Nyjah Huston, professional skateboarder who was the overall champion at the Street League Skateboarding (SLS) competition series in 2010, 2012, 2014,and 2017. He is also the highest paid skateboarder in the world. According to the interview he is of part Japanese descent.
 Bryan Iguchi, professional snowboarder
 Kyoko Ina, first place in the 1997, 1998, 2000, 2001, 2002 U.S. Figure Skating Championships (pairs)
 Rena Inoue, first place in the 2004 and 2006 U.S. Figure Skating Championships (pairs)
 Emerick Ishikawa, weightlifter
 Travis Ishikawa, MLB player
 Billy Johnson (racing driver), professional sports car and stock car racing driver. 
 Evelyn Kawamoto (1933–2017), won two Olympic bronze medals in swimming in 1952
 Kurt Kitayama, professional golfer
 Ann Kiyomura, 1975 Wimbledon doubles tennis champion.
 Ford Konno, former world record holder, two-time Olympic gold medalist, two-time Olympic silver medalist in swimming (1952 and 1956)
 Tommy Kono (1930–2016), former world record holder, two-time Olympic gold medalist and Olympic silver medalist in weightlifting (1952, 1956, and 1960)
 Shogo Kubo, professional skateboarder
 Kyle Larson, Sansei, 2021 NASCAR Cup Series champion
 Brandon League, MLB player
 Jay Litherland, competition swimmer
 Mike Lum, first American of Japanese ancestry to play in the major leagues
 Darin Maki (牧ダレン聡), Nisei professional basketball player and former judo champion
 Wataru Misaka (1923–2019), professional basketball pioneer, broke the NBA color barrier in 1947
 Collin Morikawa, professional golfer
 Mirai Nagasu, Olympic bronze medalist figure skater and women's singles champion at the 2008 U.S. Figure Skating Championships
 Keo Nakama (1920–2011), swimmer and world record holder
 Haruki Nakamura, NFL safety, Baltimore Ravens and Carolina Panthers
 Hikaru Nakamura, chess grandmaster and US champion (2005, 2009, 2012, 2015, 2019)
 Corey Nakatani, jockey with seven wins in Breeders' Cup races
 Julius Naranjo, weightlifter, coach, and filmmaker
 Teiko Nishi, Sansei, women's basketball starter for UCLA
 Apolo Anton Ohno, won eight Olympic medals in short-track speed skating (two gold) in 2002, 2006, and 2010, as well as a world cup championship
 Dan Osman, extreme sport practitioner / rock-climber, known for the dangerous sports of free-soloing. At the time of his legacy, he was considered to be the no. 1 rock-climber in the world. (He was of Japanese and European descent)
 Yoshinobu Oyakawa, former world record holder and 1952 Olympic gold medalist in the 100-meter backstroke
 Gotoku Sakai
 Harold Sakata (1920–1982), 1948 Olympic silver medalist weightlifter, actor, and wrestler
 Lenn Sakata, professional baseball player for the World Series Champions Baltimore Orioles
 Eric Sato, won a 1988 Olympic gold medal in volleyball
 Liane Sato, won a 1992 Olympic bronze medal in volleyball
 Alex Shibutani, two-time national champion and Olympic bronze medalist ice dancer
 Maia Shibutani, two-time national champion and Olympic bronze medalist ice dancer
 Kinji Shibuya, professional wrestler and actor
 Ashima Shiraishi, American rock climber
 Erik Shoji, US National team volleyball player
 Kawika Shoji, US National team volleyball player and Erik Shoji's brother
 Jelani Reshaun Sumiyoshi
 Kurt Suzuki, MLB player
 Robert Swift, NBA player
 Derek Tatsuno, baseball player selected to the All-Time All-Star Team of Collegiate Baseball America
 Shane Victorino, Sansei, MLB player
 Don Wakamatsu, Yonsei'', MLB's first Japanese-American manager
 Rex Walters, NBA player
 Kristi Yamaguchi, Yonsei, won three national figure skating championships, two world titles, and the 1992 Olympic gold medal
 Lindsey Yamasaki, professional basketball player (Miami Sol, New York Liberty, San Jose Spiders), Stanford University (basketball, volleyball)
 Roger Yasukawa, auto-racing driver (IRL)
 Christian Yelich, professional baseball outfielder for the Milwaukee Brewers of Major League Baseball (MLB). His maternal grandfather Mineo Dan Oda is Japanese.
 Wally Kaname Yonamine (1925–2011), football player; first Japanese American in the NFL; professional baseball player in Nippon Professional Baseball League

Other Academia
Nobutaka Ike, Stanford University professor of Japanese and East Asian politics
Fujio Matsuda, first Asian-American president of a major American university, as president of the University of Hawaiʻi

See also
 Foreign-born Japanese
 List of Japanese people

References

Japanese
Americans
Japanese
Japanese